The second government of José Luis Rodríguez Zapatero was formed on 14 April 2008, following the latter's election as Prime Minister of Spain by the Congress of Deputies on 11 April and his swearing-in on 12 April, as a result of the Spanish Socialist Workers' Party (PSOE) emerging as the largest parliamentary force at the 2008 Spanish general election.

The cabinet comprised members of the PSOE (including its sister party, the Socialists' Party of Catalonia, PSC) and a number of independents. It was automatically dismissed on 21 November 2011 as a consequence of the 2011 general election, but remained in acting capacity until the next government was sworn in.

Investiture

Cabinet changes
Zapatero's second government saw a number of cabinet changes during its tenure:
On 23 February 2009, Mariano Fernández Bermejo resigned as Minister of Justice after it transpired that he had participated in a hunting trip in Andalusia together with Judge Baltasar Garzón—at the time, responsible for the ongoing Gürtel case investigations involving senior People's Party (PP) members. Bermejo came under fire from PP leaders, who accused him of interfering within the investigations. While he denied such claims, he submitted his resignation due to the growing political pressure on him. He was succeeded by Francisco Caamaño.
On 7 April 2009, the cabinet saw an extensive reshuffle. Pedro Solbes stepped down as Second Deputy Prime Minister and Minister of Economy and Finance and was replaced by Elena Salgado, who in turn stepped down as Minister of Public Administrations. President of Andalusia Manuel Chaves was appointed as Third Deputy Prime Minister and new Minister of Territorial Policy. José Blanco replaced Magdalena Álvarez as Minister of Development; Ángel Gabilondo replaced Mercedes Cabrera in Education; Ángeles González-Sinde replaced César Antonio Molina in Culture and Trinidad Jiménez replaced Bernat Soria as Minister of Health.
On 21 October 2010, Celestino Corbacho stepped down as Minister of Labour and Immigration in order to run within the Socialists' Party of Catalonia (PSC)'s list for the 2010 Catalan regional election, being replaced by Valeriano Gómez. Zapatero took this opportunity to undertake a major cabinet reshuffle which saw María Teresa Fernández de la Vega being replaced as First Deputy Prime Minister and Spokesperson of the Government by Alfredo Pérez Rubalcaba—who retained his office as Minister of the Interior—and as Minister of the Presidency by Ramón Jáuregui. Trinidad Jiménez replaced Miguel Ángel Moratinos as Minister of Foreign Affairs and Cooperation; Rosa Aguilar replaced Elena Espinosa as Minister of Environment, Rural and Marine Affairs and Leire Pajín was appointed to the Health ministry. The ministries of Housing and Equality were restructured into state secretariats within the Development and Health ministries, respectively. Finally, Chaves's Territorial Policy portfolio was restructured into the Ministry of Territorial Policy and Public Administration.
On 12 July 2011, Rubalcaba stepped down from the government after having been nominated as the Spanish Socialist Workers' Party (PSOE)'s leading candidate for the 2011 general election. Subsequently, a final reshuffle took place, with changes limited to fill the vacancies: Antonio Camacho was appointed in Interior, José Blanco replaced Rubalcaba as the Government's spokesperson and the offices of the deputy prime ministers under Elena Salgado and Manuel Chaves were restructured.

Council of Ministers
The Council of Ministers was structured into the offices for the prime minister, the two deputy prime ministers, 17 ministries and the post of the spokesperson of the Government. From April 2009, the Council would include a third deputy prime minister. The number of ministries was reduced to 15 after the ministries of Housing and Equality were merged into the Development and Health departments in October 2010. From July 2011, the Council would include only two deputy prime ministers.

Departmental structure
José Luis Rodríguez Zapatero's second government was organised into several superior and governing units, whose number, powers and hierarchical structure varied depending on the ministerial department.

Unit/body rank
() Secretary of state
() Undersecretary
() Director-general
() Autonomous agency
() Military & intelligence agency

Notes

References

External links
Governments of Spain 2004–2011. Ministers of José Luis Rodríguez Zapatero. Historia Electoral.com (in Spanish).
The governments of the second period of the Spanish Socialist Workers' Party (2004–2011). Lluís Belenes i Rodríguez History Page (in Spanish).

2008 establishments in Spain
2011 disestablishments in Spain
Cabinets established in 2008
Cabinets disestablished in 2011
Council of Ministers (Spain)